Guillermo Fayed (born 28 November 1985) is a French World Cup alpine ski racer and soldier who represented France in the 2010 and 2014 Olympic Games. He took 26th with a time of 1:56:20 in the men's downhill in 2010.

World Cup results

Season standings

Race podiums
 0 wins
 4 podiums – (4 DH); 19 top tens (19 DH)

World Championship results

Olympic results

References

External links
 
 
 
 French Ski Team – 2016 men's A team – 

French male alpine skiers
Olympic alpine skiers of France
Alpine skiers at the 2010 Winter Olympics
Alpine skiers at the 2014 Winter Olympics
Living people
1985 births
People from Chamonix
Sportspeople from Haute-Savoie